Fabrizio Ciaurro is an Argentine born-Italian rugby league player who represented Italy in the 2013 Rugby League World Cup.

Playing career
He played for the Tirreno Sharks in Italy as a fullback and also spent some time in England with the Coventry Bears.

References

1989 births
Living people
Coventry Bears players
Italian expatriate rugby league players
Italian sportspeople of Argentine descent
Italian rugby league players
Italy national rugby league team players
Rugby league fullbacks
Sportspeople from Córdoba, Argentina